Effie Mona Mack (1888–1969) was an American historian, educator, and textbook co-author. She is said to be the only person to receive a Doctorate degree in  History of Nevada. The Mack Social Science building at the University of Nevada, Reno is named in her honor. She received a bachelor's degree from Smith College, a Master's at the University of Nevada (1916; thesis, The recall in the making and adoption of the federal constitution of 1787-1789), and a Ph.D. from the University of California (1930; dissertation, Life and letters of William Morris Stewart, 1827-1909. A history of his influence on state and national legislation). She taught at the University of Nevada, Reno, and at Nevada Southern, which became the University of Nevada, Las Vegas.

Selected works
 (1930) William Morris Stewart, empire builder, 1827-1909
 (1936) Nevada
 (1940) Our state: Nevada
 (1947) Mark Twain in Nevada
 (1953) Nevada government; a study of the administration and politics of State, county, township, and cities
 (1961) Territorial Centennial of Nevada- 1861-1864
 (1964) William Morris Stewart, 1827-1909
 (1965) Here is Nevada; a history of the State
 (1968) The Indian massacre of 1911 at Little High Rock Canyon, Nevada

References

External links
A Guide to Nevada, a history of the state from the earliest times through the Civil War, 82-03. Special Collections, University Libraries, University of Nevada, Reno. Edited manuscript, photographs and maps for Mack's book
Effie Mona Mack papers, 1917-1969 Nevada Historical Society.

1888 births
1969 deaths
Writers from Nevada
Historians of Nevada
Historians of the American West
Smith College alumni
University of Nevada, Reno alumni
University of California, Berkeley alumni
University of Nevada, Las Vegas faculty
University of Nevada, Reno faculty
20th-century American historians
American women historians
20th-century American women writers